Marguerite Duparc (March 13, 1933 - February 13, 1982) was a Canadian film producer and editor, best known for her collaborations with her husband Jean Pierre Lefebvre.

Born in France, Duparc emigrated to Canada in 1955, and worked in film distribution until marrying Lefebvre in the early 1960s. She was the editor of virtually all of Lefebvre's films from The Revolutionary (Le révolutionnaire) in 1965 through to Wild Flowers (Les fleurs sauvages) in 1982; through her studio Cinak, she was also producer of many but not all of the same films, as well as on films by Denys Arcand, Jean Chabot, André Blanchard, Michel Audy and Raôul Duguay. Her relationship with Lefebvre partially inspired his 1968 film Patricia and Jean-Baptiste (Patricia et Jean-Baptiste).

She was a Canadian Film Award nominee at the 25th Canadian Film Awards in 1973, as producer of Arcand's Réjeanne Padovani.

She had begun work on Histoires pour Blaise, an animated children's film which would have been her directorial debut, in the early 1980s, but the film was not completed by the time of her death of cancer in early 1982. The film was completed by Yves Rivard, and released in 1983. Her illness and death formed the basis for Lefebvre's 1983 documentary film To the Rhythm of My Heart (Au rythme de mon cœur).

Filmography

Editor

Producer

References

External links

1933 births
1982 deaths
Film producers from Quebec
Canadian women film producers
Canadian film editors
Canadian women film editors
French emigrants to Canada